Kao Tsu-min (born 1939) is a Taiwanese physician and politician.

Kao is a native of Yunlin County. After graduating from Kaohsiung Medical University, he pursued further study in physiatry at New York University. Kao practiced medicine in the United States, and his medical career in America included a stint at the White House. He accepted a presidential appointment to the Legislative Yuan, serving from 1990 to 1993, as a representative of overseas Chinese.

Kao later joined the People First Party, and in 2011, led a petition to convince party chairman James Soong to run in the 2012 Taiwanese presidential election. During the 2014 Taipei mayoral election, television host  commented on allegations of forced organ harvesting against physician and independent candidate Ko Wen-je, additionally making statements about Kao and his wife Yang Fu-mei. Kao and Yang filed a lawsuit against Tsai and network executives in 2015. The first ruling held that there was insufficient evidence for Tsai's comments harming the reputations of Kao or Yang. The Taiwan High Court ordered Tsai to pay compensation to Kao and Yang in 2017, after considering other comments that Tsai had made about them.

References

1939 births
Living people
20th-century Taiwanese physicians
New York University alumni
Kaohsiung Medical University alumni
Taiwanese expatriates in the United States
People First Party (Taiwan) politicians
Members of the 1st Legislative Yuan in Taiwan
Politicians of the Republic of China on Taiwan from Yunlin County
Spouses of Taiwanese politicians